Lightstone may refer to the following:

The Lightstone (2001), the first book of the Ea Cycle by David Zindell
The Lightstone Group, a real estate investment company based in New York
The Albert Harold Lightstone Scholarship at Queen's University, named for A. H. Lightstone

People with the surname
A. H. Lightstone (1926–1976), Canadian logician, mathematician, and Queen's University professor
Jack N. Lightstone, Canadian professor of history, and president and vice-chancellor of Brock University in St. Catharines, Ontario
Marilyn Lightstone (born 1940), Canadian film, television and voice actress